Kirundo is a city located in northern Burundi. It is the capital city of Kirundo Province.

The city is served by Kirundo Airport.

Populated places in Kirundo Province